The Bol d'or des Monédières was a cycling criterium that took place after the Tour de France, traditionally on the first Thursday in August. It was run on a circuit of about 20 kilometers to be covered seven times, around the village of Chaumeil, in the Massif des Monédières, Corrèze.

The competition's roll of honor includes the successes of Fausto Coppi, Jacques Anquetil, Rik Van Looy, Raymond Poulidor, Bernard Hinault, Laurent Fignon and Richard Virenque.

The last edition of the criterium took place in 2002. From 2005 onwards, the last stage of the Paris-Corrèze cycle race ended with five laps of the Bol d'Or des Monédières circuit.

Since the disappearance of Paris-Corrèze, the Tour du Limousin sometimes uses the Chaumeil circuit to perpetuate the tradition.

Winners

Popular culture 
A short documentary about the race was made in 1968 (Au Bol d'Or des Monédières, 1952-1967).

References 

Cycle races in France
1952 establishments in France
Defunct cycling races in France
Recurring sporting events established in 1952
Recurring sporting events disestablished in 2002
2002 disestablishments in France